Noni the Pony Rescues a Joey is a 2018 children's picture book by Alison Lester. It is about Noni, a pony, and her friends, Dave dog, and Coco the cat, who find a lost Wallaby joey and manage to reunite him with his mob.

Publication history
2018, Australia, Allen & Unwin 
2019, USA, Beach Lane Books

Reception
A reviewer for Reading Time of Noni the Pony Rescues a Joey wrote "The effortless rhyme with signature Noni illustrations is a delight to read.".

Noni the Pony Rescues a Joey has also been reviewed by Booklist, Kirkus Reviews, The Horn Book Magazine, Good Reading magazine, School Library Journal, and the International Literacy Association.

It is a 2019 Children's Book Council of Australia (CBCA) Early Childhood Notable book, and a 2019 Speech Pathology Australia Book of the Year Award (Birth to Three Years) shortlisted book.

See also
Noni the Pony
Noni the Pony Goes to the Beach

References

External links

Library holdings of Noni the Pony Rescues a Joey

2018 children's books
Australian children's books
Australian picture books
Allen & Unwin books